Sebastiano Tecchio (3 January 1807 – 24 January 1886), was an Italian lawyer and politician that was president of the Italian Senate from 1876 to 1884.

Life 

Born in Vicenza, he graduated at the University of Padua in law and worked as lawyer when Vicenza was part Kingdom of Lombardy–Venetia.
In 1849 he fought against the Austrian Empire during the First Italian War of Independence and after the Battle of Novara he was forced to leave his hometown to live in exile in the Kingdom of Sardinia where he was, for a brief time, a minister. From 1849 to 1859 he was elected as member of chamber of deputies the lower house of the Italian parliament.  After the birth of the Kingdom of Italy his political career continued and he became  president of the lower house of the parliament of the kingdom between 1862 and 1863.
In 1866, after the Third Italian War of Independence, he was named senator by king Victor Emmanuel II. In the 1870s he was also president of the appeal court of Venice, the highest judiciary body in the region of Veneto. In 1876 he was elected president of the Senate and was forced to resign from this post due to his strong support to the irredentismo.
He died in Venice in 1886.

References 

1807 births
1886 deaths
People from Vicenza
Historical Left politicians
Deputies of Legislature I of the Kingdom of Sardinia
Deputies of Legislature II of the Kingdom of Sardinia
Deputies of Legislature III of the Kingdom of Sardinia
Deputies of Legislature IV of the Kingdom of Sardinia
Deputies of Legislature V of the Kingdom of Sardinia
Deputies of Legislature VI of the Kingdom of Sardinia
Deputies of Legislature VII of the Kingdom of Sardinia
Presidents of the Chamber of Deputies (Italy)
Deputies of Legislature VIII of the Kingdom of Italy
Deputies of Legislature IX of the Kingdom of Italy
Presidents of the Italian Senate
Members of the Senate of the Kingdom of Italy
Politicians of Veneto
Italian irredentism
University of Padua alumni